Cereopsius is a genus of longhorn beetles of the subfamily Lamiinae, containing the following species:

 Cereopsius affinis Breuning, 1980
 Cereopsius alboguttatus (C. Waterhouse, 1878)
 Cereopsius amabilis Aurivillius, 1913
 Cereopsius arbiter Pascoe, 1885
 Cereopsius aureomaculatus Breuning, 1968
 Cereopsius cinereus Breuning, 1936
 Cereopsius copei Hüdepohl, 1993
 Cereopsius elongatus Breuning & de Jong, 1941
 Cereopsius erasmus  Medina, Mantilla, Cabras & Vitali, 2021
 Cereopsius exoletus Pascoe, 1857
 Cereopsius guttulatus Aurivillius, 1923
 Cereopsius helena White, 1858
 Cereopsius javanicus Breuning, 1936
 Cereopsius kulzeri Breuning, 1936
 Cereopsius luctor (Newman, 1842)
 Cereopsius luhuanus Heller, 1896
 Cereopsius mimospilotus Breuning, 1980
 Cereopsius niassensis Lansberge, 1883
 Cereopsius nigrofasciatus Aurivillius, 1913
 Cereopsius obliquemaculatus Hüdepohl, 1989 
 Cereopsius praetorius (Erichson, 1842)
 Cereopsius pulcherrimus Breuning, 1942
 Cereopsius quaestor (Newman, 1842)
 Cereopsius satelles Pascoe, 1885
 Cereopsius sexmaculatus Aurivillius, 1907
 Cereopsius sexnotatus J. Thomson, 1865
 Cereopsius shamankariyali Kano, 1939
 Cereopsius siamensis Breuning, 1936
 Cereopsius spilotoides Breuning, 1974
 Cereopsius spilotus Pascoe, 1885
 Cereopsius strandi Breuning, 1942
 Cereopsius vittipennis (Fisher, 1935)
 Cereopsius vivesi Breuning, 1978
 Cereopsius whitei Thomson, 1865
 Cereopsius ziczac (Matsushita, 1940)

References

 
Lamiini